This is a list of villages in Kangyidaunt Township, Pathein District, Ayeyarwady Region, Burma (Myanmar).

References
This list was derived from the Excel spreadsheets available at http://themimu.info/Pcodes/index.php.

Kangyidaunt